Kepler-56c is a hot Jupiter (a class of exoplanets) orbiting the star Kepler-56, located in the constellation Cygnus. It was discovered by the Kepler telescope in October 2013. Its orbit is significantly misaligned with its parent star's equator.

Both Kepler-56b and Kepler-56c will be devoured by their parent star in about 130 and 155 million years, respectively. Further research shows that it will have its atmosphere boiled away by intense heat from the star, and it will be stretched by the strengthening stellar tides.

References

External links
Kepler-56c at NASA's website
Exoplanets discovered by the Kepler space telescope
Exoplanets discovered in 2013
Cygnus (constellation)
Transiting exoplanets